Frank Small Jr. (July 15, 1896 – October 24, 1973) represented the fifth district of the state of Maryland in the United States House of Representatives for one term from 1953 to 1955.

Small was born on a farm in Temple Hills, Maryland, attended the public schools, and received technical education at the National Automobile College in 1914 and 1915. He operated several farms, and engaged in banking and the automobile business from 1923 to 1957. He served in the Maryland House of Delegates in 1927 and 1928, and was a member of the board of county commissioners from 1930 to 1934.

From 1934 to 1942, Small was a member of the Republican State Central committee, serving as chairman for some of this time. He was a member of the Maryland Racing Commission from 1937 to 1952, serving as chairman in 1951 and 1952. He was president of Clinton Bank of Clinton, Maryland from 1928 to 1972, and delegate to the Republican National Conventions of 1940, 1944, and 1956.

Small was elected as a Republican to Congress in 1952, serving from January 3, 1953, to January 3, 1955, but was an unsuccessful for reelection in 1954. He engaged in real estate from 1954 to 1973, served as Maryland Commissioner of Motor Vehicles from April 29, 1955, to April 15, 1957, Republican nominee for Governor of Maryland in 1962 (Maryland Manual 1963–64) and as vice president of the Equitable Trust Co. of Baltimore, Maryland. Small died in Washington, D.C., and is interred in Resurrection Cemetery of Clinton.

References

1896 births
1973 deaths
20th-century American politicians
American automobile salespeople
Businesspeople from Maryland
County commissioners in Maryland
Republican Party members of the Maryland House of Delegates
People from Temple Hills, Maryland
Republican Party members of the United States House of Representatives from Maryland
State cabinet secretaries of Maryland
20th-century American businesspeople